DeSagana N'gagne Diop (born January 30, 1982) is a Senegalese former professional basketball player who is currently head coach for the Westchester Knicks of the NBA G League.

Early life
Diop played soccer while growing up in Senegal. He began practicing basketball at the age of 15 and moved to the US to play for Oak Hill Academy, where he succeeded in averaging 14.6 points, 13.2 rebounds, and 8.1 blocks during his senior year. He earned the USA Today Virginia Player of the Year title and led Oak Hill Academy in Mouth of Wilson, Virginia, to a #1 nation ranking (33 wins, 0 losses).

Diop speaks five languages: Arabic, English, French, Wolof and some Spanish.

Professional career

Cleveland Cavaliers (2001–2005) 
Diop was drafted directly out of Oak Hill Academy by the Cleveland Cavaliers with the 8th overall pick of the 2001 NBA draft. He was the fifth high school player, after Kwame Brown, Tyson Chandler, Eddy Curry and Ousmane Cisse to declare for the draft. As a reserve center, he played 193 games in four seasons with the Cavaliers, averaging 1.6 points, 2.6 rebounds and 0.8 blocks in 10.8 minutes per contest.

On November 23, 2002, Diop dropped a career high 10 points in a 97–84 loss to the New Orleans Hornets.

The Cavaliers heavily struggled in Diop's first few years with the team. The franchise eventually began to improve with the addition of an 18 year old LeBron James in the 2003 NBA draft. In the 2004–05 season, the Cavaliers had posted their best record since the 1997–98 season, going 42–40. However they still missed the playoffs and this was Diop's final year with the team.

Dallas Mavericks (2005–2008) 
Diop signed a three-year contract with the Dallas Mavericks as a free agent on August 19, 2005. Diop, a defensive player who specialized in shot blocking and rebounding, shared the center position with Erick Dampier. He had joined a winning team, and the 2005–2006 season was Diop's most successful season regarding playoff success as the Mavericks went 60–22, made a deep playoff push and reached the 2006 finals. The Mavericks ended up losing the finals in 6 games to the Miami Heat.

Against the New York Knicks in a pre-season game, Diop hit the game-winning tip-in off of a missed shot by Keith Van Horn.

On November 15, 2005, Diop recorded a career high 16 rebounds in an 83–80 win over the Denver Nuggets. In that same game, Diop also recorded a career high 6 blocks—including a denial of Carmelo Anthony's potentially game-winning field goal attempt.

On January 14, 2006, he became a full-time starter for the Mavericks for the rest of the regular season and into the playoffs, assisting in the Mavericks qualifying for the 2006 NBA Finals as representatives of the Western Conference.

In March 2006, two Mavericks fans produced a version of the hip-hop song "Jump" by Kris Kross. In their version, the refrain "Jump! Jump!" was turned into "Diop! Diop!", and the video praises Diop's shotblocking ability. It became so popular that the Mavs started to play the video at their home games. Diop said, "I remember the first time they played the video during a timeout and I was trying to pay attention to what coach [Johnson] was trying to say but I was sneaking looks at the video."

For the 2005–06 season, he ranked 11th in total blocks, 14th in blocks per game, and 4th in blocks per 48 minutes. In Game 7 of the 2006 Western Conference Semifinals between San Antonio and Dallas, Diop, playing with a broken nose, grabbed three offensive rebounds (four total), and blocked two of Tim Duncan's shots in the second and fourth quarter and overtime.

On April 11, 2007, Diop recorded his first double-double with season highs of 10 points and 15 rebounds in the Mavs' franchise-high 30th road victory, a 105–88 win over the Minnesota Timberwolves.

The Mavericks finished the 2006–2007 season even more successful than the previous season, with a franchise best 67–15 record. They were extremely dominant throughout the season, and unlike the previous season, they were expected to reach the finals again. They grabbed the 1st seed in the Western Conference, and matched up with the Golden State Warriors in the first round. The Warriors had gone 42–40 and were barely a winning team that season, they were expected to be heavily outmatched by the Mavericks. In what was considered the greatest playoff upset of all time, the Warriors defeated the Mavericks in 6 games and advanced to the second round. Led by Baron Davis, the Warriors stunned the Mavericks and outplayed them in the series. The Mavericks had the best record in the league, but they ended up losing because the Warriors had matched up very well against them. One of the main reasons was Don Nelson. Nelson, who was the head coach of the Warriors and former head coach of the Mavericks, had understood how to defend the Mavericks well as he coached them the previous season. In the 2006–2007 season the Warriors won the season series 3–1 against them. Despite Diop's and the Mavericks' best efforts, the Warriors played very well against them and managed to knock out the best team in the league in the first round.

New Jersey Nets (2008) 
On February 19, 2008, Diop was traded to the New Jersey Nets, along with signed-and-traded Keith Van Horn, Devin Harris, Trenton Hassell, Maurice Ager, and roughly $3 million cash and 2008 and 2010 first-round draft picks in exchange for Jason Kidd, Malik Allen, and Antoine Wright.

Diop never achieved the same team success as he did in the 2005–2006 and 2006–2007 seasons as the Nets entered a stage of rebuilding and finished the 2007–2008 season with a mediocre 34–48 record and missed the playoffs.

Return to Dallas (2008–2009) 
On July 9, 2008, Diop signed a six-year, $32 million contract with the Dallas Mavericks.

Diop's return to Dallas was short as he didn't finish the 2008-2009 season with the team.

Charlotte Bobcats (2009–2013) 
On January 16, 2009, Diop was traded to the Charlotte Bobcats for guard Matt Carroll and center Ryan Hollins.

Diop spent the rest of his playing career with the Charlotte Bobcats. The Bobcats had been a struggling team for the past few years prior but they had been steadily improving and finished the 2008-2009 season 35-47 and missed the playoffs by 4 games. In the following 2009-2010 season the Bobcats, led by all star Gerald Wallace and leader Stephen Jackson, went 44-38 and made the playoffs as the 7th seed in the Eastern Conference. They faced a difficult opponent in the Orlando Magic, and although the Bobcats played great defense and kept each game close, they eventually lost to the Magic in a 4-game sweep. Diop continued to play well for the team however the roster had drastically changed in the following seasons and unfortunately he missed the playoffs for the rest of his career. In the following season the Bobcats only went 34-48 and the team's roster had shifted as Charlotte entered another rebuild. In the 2011-2012 season the Bobcats made history by having the worst record in NBA history, ending the season with an abysmal 7–59 record. The team had acquired young players and were set to make the playoffs in the future, however Diop only played one more season with the Bobcats and they ended up missing the playoffs in the 2012-2013 season. On March 4, 2013, Diop played his final NBA game; a 105–122 loss hosted by the Portland Trail Blazers; where he recorded two points, two rebounds, one block, and one foul in over 15 minutes of playing time.

On September 30, 2013, Diop signed with the Cleveland Cavaliers. However he didn't play for the team as he was waived before the season started on October 25.

Diop retired from the NBA shortly after at 31 years old.

Coaching career
On November 11, 2014, Diop joined the coaching staff of the Texas Legends of the NBA Development League as a player development coach. On October 19, 2015, he was promoted to assistant coach.

On October 3, 2016, Diop was hired by the Utah Jazz as a coaching associate.

On November 30, 2020, Diop was hired by the Houston Rockets as an assistant coach.

NBA career statistics

Regular season 

|-
| align="left" | 
| align="left" | Cleveland
| 18 || 1 || 6.1 || .414 || .000 || .200 || .9 || .3 || .1 || .6 || 1.4
|-
| align="left" | 
| align="left" | Cleveland
| 80 || 1 || 11.8 || .351 || .000 || .367 || 2.7 || .5 || .4 || 1.0 || 1.5
|-
| align="left" | 
| align="left" | Cleveland
| 56 || 3 || 13.0 || .388 || .000 || .600 || 3.6 || .6 || .5 || .9 || 2.3
|-
| align="left" | 
| align="left" | Cleveland
| 39 || 0 || 7.8 || .290 || .000 || .000 || 1.8 || .4 || .2 || .7 || 1.0
|-
| align="left" | 
| align="left" | Dallas
| 81 || 45 || 18.6 || .487 || .500 || .542 || 4.6 || .3 || .5 || 1.8 || 2.3
|-
| align="left" | 
| align="left" | Dallas
| 81 || 9 || 18.3 || .470 || .000 || .558 || 5.4 || .4 || .5 || 1.4 || 2.3
|-
| align="left" | 
| align="left" | Dallas
| 52 || 18 || 17.2 || .583 || .000 || .600 || 5.2 || .5 || .4 || 1.2 || 3.0
|-
| align="left" | 
| align="left" | New Jersey
| 27 || 5 || 14.9 || .415 || .000 || .467 || 4.5 || .5 || .2 || .9 || 2.5
|-
| align="left" | 
| align="left" | Dallas
| 34 || 0 || 13.3 || .379 || .000 || .414 || 3.5 || .4 || .4 || .7 || 1.6
|-
| align="left" | 
| align="left" | Charlotte
| 41 || 1 || 14.2 || .460 || .000 || .270 || 3.8 || .5 || .4 || .8 || 2.8
|-
| align="left" | 
| align="left" | Charlotte
| 27 || 0 || 9.7 || .517 || .000 || .222 || 2.4 || .2 || .2 || .5 || 1.2
|-
| align="left" | 
| align="left" | Charlotte
| 16 || 0 || 11.3 || .333 || .000 || .364 || 2.5 || .4 || .3 || .9 || 1.3
|-
| align="left" | 
| align="left" | Charlotte
| 27 || 9 || 12.0 || .357 || .000 || .167 || 3.1 || .9 || .2 || .5 || 1.1
|-
| align="left" | 
| align="left" | Charlotte
| 22 || 1 || 10.3 || .296 || .000 || .000 || 2.3 || .6 || .2 || .7 || .7
|- class="sortbottom"
| style="text-align:center;" colspan="2"| Career
| 601 || 93 || 14.0 || .427 || .167 || .467 || 3.7 || .4 || .4 || 1.0 || 2.0

Playoffs 

|-
| align="left" | 2006
| align="left" | Dallas
| 22 || 18 || 18.5 || .615 || .000 || .611 || 5.0 || .1 || .6 || 1.3 || 2.7
|-
| align="left" | 2007
| align="left" | Dallas
| 6 || 3 || 23.3 || .600 || .000 || .429 || 6.8 || .3 || .5 || 1.7 || 3.5
|- class="sortbottom"
| style="text-align:center;" colspan="2"| Career
| 28 || 21 || 19.5 || .611 || .000 || .560 || 5.4 || .1 || .6 || 1.4 || 2.9

See also 
 List of foreign NBA coaches

References

External links

NBA.com profile 
ESPN.com profile
Charlotte Bobcats player profile

1982 births
Living people
Centers (basketball)
Charlotte Bobcats players
Cleveland Cavaliers draft picks
Cleveland Cavaliers players
Dallas Mavericks players
McDonald's High School All-Americans
National Basketball Association high school draftees
National Basketball Association players from Senegal
New Jersey Nets players
Parade High School All-Americans (boys' basketball)
Senegalese expatriate basketball people in the United States
Basketball players from Dakar
Houston Rockets assistant coaches
Texas Legends coaches
Utah Jazz assistant coaches
Senegalese men's basketball players